Michael L. Dodson (born November 16, 1945) is a Republican member of the Kansas House of Representatives, representing the 67th district.  His term began January 11, 2021 upon the retirement of his predecessor Tom Phillips.

Dodson was elected to a full term in the November 2020 general election, defeating Democrat Cheryl Arthur.

Dodson is a general manager for Bechtel, the largest construction company in the United States. He is a retired United States Army lieutenant general and had previous political experience as a city commissioner and mayor of Manhattan, Kansas (2015-2018).

Record
Dodson sponsored three resolutions in the 2021 session.

Committee membership
Dodson serves on four legislative committees in 2021:
 Elections
 Commerce, Labor and Economic Development
 Insurance and Pensions
 Veterans and Military

Early life and education
Michael Lee Dodson was born in Oklahoma City, Oklahoma, where his mother was staying with his aunt's family while his father was serving as a bomber pilot with the Army Air Forces. After his father was discharged from World War II service, they moved back to Colville, Washington. Dodson graduated from Colville High School and then enrolled at the University of Washington. He enlisted in the Army during the Vietnam War and was commissioned as a field artillery officer in 1968. Dodson later earned an M.S. degree in operations research and systems analysis from Kansas State University. He is also a graduate of the Army Command and General Staff College and the National War College.

Military career
Dodson received fixed-wing and rotary flight training at Fort Rucker in Alabama. He was deployed to Vietnam twice, first with the 334th Armored Helicopter Company and then with the 2nd Battalion, 20th Aerial Rocket Artillery, 1st Cavalry Division.

In peacetime, Dodson commanded C Battery, 2nd Battalion, 1st Field Artillery Regiment and then 3rd Battalion, 16th Field Artillery Regiment in Baumholder, West Germany. During Operation Desert Storm, he commanded the 1st Infantry Division Artillery. Dodson later served as commanding general of the III Corps Artillery at Fort Sill in Oklahoma and then of Fort Riley in Kansas.

As a lieutenant general, he served as commander of the Stabilisation Force in Bosnia and Herzegovina from September 8, 2000, to September 7, 2001, and then as deputy commander of U.S. Army Europe and the Seventh Army from September 17, 2001, to November 4, 2003.

Dodson's military decorations include two Defense Distinguished Service Medals, two Army Distinguished Service Medals, a Silver Star Medal, a Defense Superior Service Medal, four awards of the Legion of Merit, two Distinguished Flying Crosses, four Bronze Star Medals, four Meritorious Service Medals and forty-five Air Medals.

Personal
Dodson is the son of Tom Dodson and Shirley Elizabeth (Wylie) Dodson (January 12, 1925 – September 19, 2014). They were married on January 12, 1945, in Pullman, Washington. Dodson has a brother and a sister.

Dodson is married to Diane Dodson and they have three adult children.

References

External links
 Kansas Legislature - Michael Dodson
 Project Vote Smart profile

1945 births
Living people
People from Oklahoma City
People from Colville, Washington
University of Washington alumni
United States Army soldiers
American Senior Army Aviators
United States Army personnel of the Vietnam War
Recipients of the Air Medal
Recipients of the Distinguished Flying Cross (United States)
Recipients of the Silver Star
Kansas State University alumni
United States Army Command and General Staff College alumni
National War College alumni
United States Army personnel of the Gulf War
Recipients of the Meritorious Service Medal (United States)
Recipients of the Legion of Merit
United States Army generals
Recipients of the Defense Superior Service Medal
Recipients of the Distinguished Service Medal (US Army)
Recipients of the Defense Distinguished Service Medal
Politicians from Manhattan, Kansas
Mayors of places in Kansas
Republican Party members of the Kansas House of Representatives
21st-century American politicians